Jack Harry Harrow (8 October 1888 – 19 July 1958) was an English footballer who spent his entire professional career at Chelsea. He played mainly as a left-back. He was good at tackling and he also had an accurate shot.

Harrow signed for Chelsea for a fee of £50 from Croydon Common in 1911 and remained until 1926. He was club captain for much of that period, and led Chelsea to their first appearance in an FA Cup final in 1915, although they lost 3–0 on the day to Sheffield United in a match overshadowed by World War I. He was the first Chelsea player to make over 300 appearances, and ended his career with 333 in all competitions.

He played twice for the England national team, winning caps against Northern Ireland and Sweden in 1922 and 1923 respectively.

He died in 1958.

Personal life 
Harrow served as an Air Mechanic 2nd Class in the Royal Air Force during the First World War.

References

External links
England profile
Chelsea profile

1888 births
1958 deaths
Croydon Common F.C. players
Chelsea F.C. players
England international footballers
English footballers
English Football League players
English Football League representative players
Association football fullbacks
Footballers from Mitcham
Royal Air Force personnel of World War I
Association football wing halves
Chelsea F.C. non-playing staff
FA Cup Final players
Royal Air Force airmen